Belaya Gora may refer to:
Belaya Gora Urban Settlement, a municipal formation into which the Settlement of Belaya Gora in Abyysky District of the Sakha Republic, Russia is incorporated
Belaya Gora (inhabited locality), several inhabited localities in Russia
Belaya Gora Airport, an airport in the Sakha Republic, Russia